Clash of Loyalties (aka The Great Question) is a 1983 Iraqi film focusing on the formation of Iraq out of Mesopotamia in the aftermath of the First World War.

The film was financed by Saddam Hussein, filmed in Iraq (mainly at the Baghdad Film Studios in Baghdad's Mansour neighbourhood and on location at the Tigris-Euphrates marshlands, Babylon and Kut) at the height of the Iran–Iraq War and starred Oliver Reed as Gerard Leachman, Marc Sinden as Captain Dawson and Helen Ryan as Gertrude Bell, with  score by Ron Goodwin.

Investigative journalist James Montague, writing in the July 2014 issue of Esquire magazine, claimed that Marc Sinden spied for the British Government's Secret Intelligence Service (MI6) during the filming of Clash of Loyalties in Iraq, after being made "an offer he couldn’t refuse, appealing to his duty and his pride in Queen and Country." In the article Sinden admitted that it was true.

It is known for being the last film made to use the now banned "Running W" technique, invented by famed stuntman Yakima (Yak) Canutt, which was a method of bringing down a horse at the gallop by attaching a wire, anchored to the ground, to its fetlocks and so launching the rider forwards spectacularly at a designated point. It invariably killed the horse, or at best it was unrideable afterwards. The British stuntman Ken Buckle (who had been trained by Yak) performed the highly-dangerous stunt three times during the huge cavalry charge sequence.

Both Arab and English versions of the film were produced.

Release and Reception
The film was nominated for the Golden Prize at the 13th Moscow International Film Festival in 1983. It was screened at the 1984 London Film Festival, but was not otherwise shown theatrically in the United Kingdom.<ref>Secret History: Saddam Goes to Hollywood, Channel 4, 24 July 2016</ref>

Cast
 Yousef al-Any as Blind Leader
 Ghazi al-Takriti as Dhari al-Mahmood
 Bernard Archard as Sir Percy Cox
 John Barron as General Haldane
 James Bolam as A. T. Wilson
 Helen Cherry as Lady Cox
 Barrie Cookson as Colonel Hardcastle
 Sami Abdul Hameed as Nationalist Leader (as Sami Abdul Hamid)
 Oliver Reed as Colonel Leachman
 Helen Ryan as Gertrude Bell
 Marc Sinden as Captain Dawson
 Michael Hordern as the Narrator

See alsoLion of the Desert'', similar Libyan film financed by Gaddafi

References

External links

1983 films
1983 drama films
Epic films based on actual events
Films based on actual events
Iraqi drama films
Films set in 1920
Films shot in Iraq
Films scored by Ron Goodwin
Historical epic films
Saddam Hussein